Elijah Chelimo Kipterege (born 20 April 1987) is a Kenyan long-distance runner who specializes in the 3000 metres steeplechase.

He finished eleventh at the 2009 World Athletics Final. His personal best time is 8:10.63 minutes, achieved in May 2009 in Doha.

References

1987 births
Living people
Kenyan male long-distance runners
Kenyan male steeplechase runners
Place of birth missing (living people)
21st-century Kenyan people